The list of ship launches in 1968 includes a chronological list of ships launched in 1968.  In cases where no official launching ceremony was held, the date built or completed may be used instead.


References 

Sources

</ref>

1968
 Ship launches
 Ship launches
Ship launches